The 2019 Louisiana Ragin' Cajuns football team represented the University of Louisiana at Lafayette in the 2019 NCAA Division I FBS football season. The Ragin' Cajuns played their home games at Cajun Field in Lafayette, Louisiana, and competed in the West Division of the Sun Belt Conference. They were led by second-year head coach Billy Napier. The Cajuns made it to the Sun Belt Conference Championship Game for the second consecutive year by winning the West Division, ultimately losing to Appalachian State by the score of 45–38. The Cajuns then defeated Miami (OH) in the LendingTree Bowl, to end the season with an overall record of 11–3. Following the season, head coach Billy Napier's contract was extended by two years, going into the 2025 season.

Previous season
The Ragin' Cajuns completed the 2018 season 7–7, 5–3 in Sun Belt play to finish in a two-way tie for first place in the West Division, along with Arkansas State, in their first year of Divisional play in the Sun Belt Conference. The Ragin' Cajuns, winning their regular season game to Arkansas State, won the chance to play in the inaugural Sun Belt Conference Championship Game, losing to Appalachian State 30–19. The Cajuns, finishing second in the Sun Belt, were invited to play in the Cure Bowl, their first time. They played in-state rival Tulane and lost 41–24.

Preseason

Recruiting class

Award watch lists
Listed in the order that they were released

Sun Belt coaches poll
The Sun Belt coaches poll was released on July 18, 2019. Louisiana was picked to finish 1st in the West Division with 46 total votes and picked to finish second in the conference with 6 1st place votes behind Appalachian State's 7.

Sun Belt Preseason All-Conference teams

Offense

1st team

Ja'Marcus Bradley - R-SR, Wide Receiver
Kevin Dotson – R-SR, Offensive Lineman
Robert Hunt - R-SR, Offensive Lineman

2nd team

Elijah Mitchell - JR, Running Back
Trey Ragas – R-JR, Running Back

Defensive

2nd team

Zi'Yon Hill - SO, Defensive Lineman
Jacques Boudreaux - SR, Linebacker
Michael Jacquet - R-SR, Defensive Back

Roster

Schedule
The 2019 schedule consists of 6 home and 6 away games in the regular season. The Ragin' Cajuns will travel to Sun Belt foes Arkansas State, Coastal Carolina, Georgia Southern, and South Alabama. The Cajuns will play host to Sun Belt foes Appalachian State, Louisiana-Monroe, Texas State, and Troy.

The Ragin' Cajuns will host two of the four non-conference opponents at Cajun Field, Liberty Flames, and Independent school in Division I FBS Football and the Texas Southern Tigers of the SWAC, will travel to Mid-American Conference (MAC) member Ohio, and will play host to the Mississippi State Bulldogs of the Southeastern Conference (SEC) at the Mercedes-Benz Superdome.

Schedule Source:

Game summaries

Mississippi State

Liberty

Texas Southern

at Ohio

at Georgia Southern

Appalachian State

at Arkansas State

Texas State

at Coastal Carolina

at South Alabama

Troy

Louisiana–Monroe

at Appalachian State (Sun Belt Championship Game)

vs. Miami (OH) (LendingTree Bowl)

Rankings

Postseason

All-Sun Belt Conference Football Team

Offense

1st team
Kevin Dotson - SR, Offensive Lineman
Robert Hunt – SR, Offensive Lineman
2nd team
Elijah Mitchell – JR, Running Back
Ja'Marcus Bradley – SR, Wide Receiver
3rd team
Raymond Calais – SR, Running Back
Trey Ragas – JR, Running Back 

Defensive

2nd team
Zi'Yon Hill – SO, Defensive Lineman
Joe dillon – JR, Linebacker
Michael Jacquet – SR, Defensive Back

Special teams

1st team
Raymond calais – SR, Return Specialist
2nd team
Rhys burns – SO, Punter
3rd team
Stevie artigue – SR, Kicker
Raymond calais – SR, All-Purpose

Honorable Mention

Jacques boudreaux – SR, Linebacker
Jarrod jackson – R-SR, Wide Receiver
Chauncey manac – R-JR, Linebacker
Nick Ralston – GR, Tight End

References:

Louisiana Sports Writers Association All-Louisiana Team

Offense

1st team
Kevin Dotson - SR, Offensive Lineman
Robert Hunt – SR, Offensive Lineman
Elijah Mitchell – JR, Running Back
2nd team
Ja'Marcus Bradley – SR, Wide Receiver

Defensive

1st team
Jacques boudreaux – SR, Linebacker
2nd team
Zi'Yon Hill – SO, Defensive Lineman

Special teams

1st team
Raymond Calais – SR, Return Specialist
Rhys burns – SO, Punter

Honorable Mention

Joe dillon – R-SR, Linebacker

References:

Postseason Personal Accolades

References:

Players in the NFL

Players Drafted

References:

Players Signed (Undrafted Free Agents)

References:

References

Louisiana
Louisiana Ragin' Cajuns football seasons
Louisiana Ragin' Cajuns football